Saturate may refer to:

 Saturate (Breaking Benjamin album), 2002
 Saturate (Gojira album), 1999
 Saturate (Jeff Deyo album), 2002
 "Electronic Battle Weapon 8", a song by The Chemical Brothers, a shorter version of which was released under the name "Saturate"

See also
"Saturated", a song by Opshop, from the album You Are Here
Saturation (disambiguation)